The Mission Theatre is a theatre in Bath, England.

In 2004, the Next Stage Theatre Company took possession of a grade II listed building originally built as a Congregational hall in 1797. During World War II the building was used by Air Raid Wardens.  It was used by The People's Mission until 1998, when building work began to convert it into a theatre.

It is now owned by the Bath and North East Somerset Council, which has granted a lease to occupy and use the building as a 100-seat theatre, arts centre and multi-purpose facility for community activities.

On the first floor there is a small 30-seat theatre (The Theatre Upstairs) and a Bistro open during the day and providing meals before performances in the theatre.

References

External links
Official website

Theatres completed in 2004
Theatres in Bath, Somerset
Grade II listed buildings in Bath, Somerset